Mykhailo Bulkin (born February 8, 1991) is a Ukrainian footballer.

Playing career 
Bulkin began his football career in 2008 in the Ukrainian Second League with FC Ros Bila Tserkva, where he appeared in a total of 15 matches. During his time in the second league he had stints with FC Desna Chernihiv, and FC Dynamo Khmelnytskyi. In 2012, he signed with FC Arsenal-Kyivshchyna Bila Tserkva which played in the Ukrainian First League. The following year he played with FC Podillya Khmelnytskyi, and in 2016 he went overseas to Canada to play with FC Ukraine United of the Canadian Soccer League. After the relegation of Ukraine United to the Second Division he signed with FC Vorkuta.

References 

Living people
1991 births
Ukrainian footballers
FC Ros Bila Tserkva players
FC Desna Chernihiv players
FC Dynamo Khmelnytskyi players
FC Arsenal-Kyivshchyna Bila Tserkva players
FC Podillya Khmelnytskyi players
FC Ukraine United players
FC Continentals players
Canadian Soccer League (1998–present) players
Association football midfielders
Ukrainian First League players
Ukrainian expatriate footballers
Ukrainian expatriate sportspeople in Canada
Expatriate soccer players in Canada
Ukrainian Second League players